Eupempelus illuminus is a species of beetle in the family Cerambycidae. It was described by Mermudes and Napp in 2001.

References

Heteropsini
Beetles described in 2001